Face Control is Handsome Furs' second full-length album, which was released through Sub Pop Records. The album was recorded and mixed by Wolf Parade's Arlen Thompson at Mount Zoomer, and it was mastered by Harris Newman at Hotel2Tango.

The album's title takes its name from the face control policy seen in upscale Russian nightclubs where people are admitted based on physical attractiveness.

Background and Release
The album was heavily influenced by the Handsome Furs' travels through Eastern Europe. Dan Boeckner has referred to the album as a "travel diary." In choosing the album's title, Boeckner said:

Face Control was originally set to be released on February 3, 2009. However, the album's release dated was delayed until March 10, 2009, due to a legal issue. According to the official Wolf Parade fansite, the Handsome Furs referenced a New Order song on the track "All We Want, Baby, Is Everything". In order to use the reference, the band needed to legally clear it with New Order, which took some time to do and caused the release to be pushed back.

Reception

Face Control has received generally positive reviews. On the review aggregate site Metacritic, the album has a score of 68 out of 100, indicating "generally favorable reviews."

Pitchfork Media's Paul Thompson praised the album, writing "On every conceivable level down to the cover art, Face Control bests its predecessor, adding stuttering nuance to their previously too-spare sound, which they drape over some of the finest songs Boeckner's ever written." Drowned in Sound's Alexander Tudor compared the album to Bruce Springsteen's Born in the U.S.A., writing "Yeah, it’s THAT good..." Margaret Reges of Allmusic called Face Control "...a solid album, and just another example of Boeckner and Perry's tingling creative chemistry."

Matthew Cole of Slant Magazine gave the album a mixed review, writing "Fans of off-kilter pop will enjoy at least a few of the stronger cuts, but too much of Face Control sounds like the unfinished blueprint of a much better album." In a scathing review, The A.V. Club's Chris Martins wrote "Everything about these songs feels lazy, from the sludgy rock and tinsel-thin beats of 'Evangeline' to the couple’s weak approximation of The Knife on '(White City)' to the half-assed 'Dancing In The Dark' paean at the end of 'Legal Tender.'" Martins concluded: "This is easily the most flavorless fruit yet to fall from the Wolf Parade family tree."

Spinner named Face Control the best Canadian album of 2009. The album was nominated for the Juno Award for Alternative Album of the Year in the 2010 Juno Awards, where it lost to Metric's Fantasies. In addition, Face Control was one of the long list nominees for the 2009 Polaris Music Prize.

Track listing

Personnel
The following people contributed to Face Control:

Handsome Furs
 Dan Boeckner
 Alexei Perry

Additional personnel
 Jouko Lehtola - Artwork
 Harris Newman - Mastering, Remastering
 Dusty Summers - Art Direction
 Arlen Thompson - Audio Engineer, Engineer, Mixing

Charts

Videos
 "Legal Tender" - Radio K in-studio performance.
 "Thy Will Be Done" - Radio K in-studio performance.
 "I'm Confused" - Directed by Scott Coffey.

References

External links
 Sub Pop Records page on Face Control 

2009 albums
Handsome Furs albums
Sub Pop albums